Abbas Kassem Awad (born 1 August 1993) is a Lebanese footballer who plays as a full-back for  club Safa.

Club career 
Starting his career at Shabab Arabi in the Lebanese Third Division, on 1 August 2013, Lebanese Premier League club Ansar announced the signing of Awad. On 31 August 2016, Awad moved on a one-year loan to Racing Beirut.

Between 2017 and 2020, Awad played futsal for Bank of Beirut. He joined Shabab Bourj on 28 August 2020, and Safa on 12 August 2022.

International career 
Awad played for the Lebanon national under-23 team in 2015 at the 2016 AFC U-23 Championship qualification. He had already played two senior games in 2014, in friendlies against the United Arab Emirates and Qatar.

Honours 
Racing Beirut
 Lebanese Challenge Cup: 2016

References

External links
 
 
 
 

1993 births
Living people
People from Aley District
Lebanese footballers
Futsal defenders
Association football fullbacks
Al Shabab Al Arabi Club Beirut players
Al Ansar FC players
Racing Club Beirut players
Shabab El Bourj SC players
Safa SC players
Lebanese Premier League players
Lebanon youth international footballers
Lebanon international footballers
Lebanese men's futsal players